The Carolina mountain dusky salamander (Desmognathus carolinensis) is a species of salamander in the family Plethodontidae.

Distribution
The species is endemic to the Appalachian Mountains within North Carolina in the south-eastern United States. Subranges it is found in include the Blue Ridge Mountains.

Its natural habitats are temperate forests, rivers, intermittent rivers, freshwater springs, and rocky areas.

It is threatened by habitat loss.

References

Desmognathus
Salamander, Carolina Mountain
Ecology of the Appalachian Mountains
Endemic fauna of North Carolina
~
Taxonomy articles created by Polbot
Amphibians described in 1916